Anomaloglossus degranvillei (common name: Degranville's rocket frog) is a species of frog in the family Aromobatidae.
It is known from French Guiana but is likely to occur also in Suriname and Brazil, and possibly in Guyana. It is named in honour of Jean-Jacques de Granville, a botanist from French Guiana.

Description
Their ventral colouration is black brown with white spots. Male frogs carry tadpoles on their back where they complete their development; tadpoles do not feed.

Habitat and conservation
Anomaloglossus degranvillei inhabit edges of rocky streams. They are not found where streams cross swampy or sandy terrain. They are diurnal and appear to be territorial.

References

degranvillei
Amphibians of French Guiana
Taxonomy articles created by Polbot
Amphibians described in 1975